Bangkok Sign Language (also known as Old or Original Bangkok Sign Language)  is a deaf-community sign language of Thailand that arose among deaf people who migrated to Bangkok for work or family. 
The language is moribund, with all speakers born before 1960. Younger generations have switched to Thai Sign Language, which seems to have arisen as a mixture of Old Bangkok SL and American Sign Language.

References
James Woodward, "Sign Languages and Deaf Identities in Thailand and Vietnam". In Monaghan et al. eds, Many Ways to Be Deaf: International Variation in Deaf Communities, 2003

Thailand Sign Language family
Endangered sign languages